On the Corner is a studio album by American jazz trumpeter, bandleader, and composer Miles Davis. It was recorded in June and July 1972 and released on October 11 of the same year by Columbia Records. The album continued Davis's exploration of jazz fusion, and explicitly drew on the influence of funk musicians Sly Stone and James Brown, the experimental music of Karlheinz Stockhausen, ideas by composer Paul Buckmaster, and the free jazz of Ornette Coleman.

Recording sessions for the album featured a changing lineup of musicians including bassist Michael Henderson, guitarist John McLaughlin, and keyboardist Herbie Hancock, with Davis playing the electric organ more prominently than his trumpet. Various takes from the sessions were then spliced together using the tape editing techniques of producer Teo Macero. The album's packaging did not credit any musicians, an attempt to make the instruments less discernible to critics. Its artwork features Corky McCoy's cartoon designs of urban African-American characters.

On the Corner was in part an effort by Davis to reach a younger African American audience who had left jazz for funk and rock and roll. Instead, thanks to Columbia's lack of target marketing, it was one of Davis's worst-selling albums and was scorned by jazz critics at the time of its release. It would be Davis's last studio album of the 1970s conceived as a complete work; subsequently, he recorded haphazardly and focused instead on live performance before temporarily retiring from music in 1975.

The critical standing of On the Corner has improved dramatically with the passage of time. Many outside the jazz community later called it an innovative musical statement and forerunner to subsequent funk, jazz, post-punk, electronica, and hip hop. In 2007, On the Corner was reissued as part of the 6-disc box set The Complete On the Corner Sessions, joining previous multi-disc Davis reissues.

Background 

Following his turn to fusion in the late 1960s and the release of rock- and funk-influenced albums such as Bitches Brew (1970) and Jack Johnson (1971), Miles Davis received substantial criticism from the jazz community. Critics accused him of abandoning his talents and pandering to commercial trends, though his recent albums had been commercially unsuccessful by his standards. Other jazz contemporaries, such as Herbie Hancock, Cecil Taylor, and Gil Evans defended Davis; the latter stated that "jazz has always used the rhythm of the time, whatever people danced to". In early 1972, Davis began conceiving On the Corner as an attempt to reconnect with the young African-American audience which had largely forsaken jazz for the groove-based music of Sly and the Family Stone and James Brown. In an interview with Melody Maker, Davis stated that 
"I don't care who buys the record so long as they get to the black people so I will be remembered when I die. I'm not playing for any white people, man. I wanna hear a black guy say 'Yeah, I dig Miles Davis.'"

Also cited as an influence by Davis was the work of experimental composer Karlheinz Stockhausen, in particular his forays into electronic music and tape manipulation. Davis was first introduced to Stockhausen's work in 1972 by collaborator Paul Buckmaster, and the trumpeter reportedly kept a cassette recording of the 1966–67 Hymnen composition in his Lamborghini sports car. Some concepts from Stockhausen that appealed to Davis included the electronic sound processing found in Hymnen and the 1966 piece Telemusik, and the development of musical structures by expanding and minimizing processes based on preconceived principles—as featured in Plus-Minus and other Stockhausen works from the 1960s and early 1970s. Davis began to apply these ideas to his music by adding and taking away instrumentalists and other aural elements throughout a recording to create a progressively changing soundscape. Speaking about Stockhausen's influence, Davis later wrote in his autobiography: I had always written in a circular way and through Stockhausen I could see that I didn't want to ever play again from eight bars to eight bars, because I never end songs: they just keep going on. Through Stockhausen I understood music as a process of elimination and addition.

The work of Buckmaster (who played electric cello on the album and contributed some arrangements) and the "harmolodics" of saxophonist Ornette Coleman would also be an influence on the album. In his biography, Davis later described On the Corner with the formula "Stockhausen plus funk plus Ornette Coleman." Using this conceptual framework, Davis reconciled ideas from contemporary art music composition, jazz performance, and rhythm-based dance music.

Recording and production 

Recording sessions began in June 1972. Both sides of the record consisted of repetitive drum and bass grooves based around a one-chord modal approach, with the final cut culled from hours of jams featuring changing personnel lineups underpinned by bassist Michael Henderson. Other musicians involved in the recording included guitarist John McLaughlin, drummers Jack DeJohnette and Billy Hart, and keyboardists Herbie Hancock and Chick Corea. On the Corner utilized three keyboardists like Bitches Brew while pairing Hart—who had played in Hancock's Mwandishi-era band—with DeJohnette and two percussionists. Hancock's reed player, Bennie Maupin, played bass clarinet and Dave Liebman was recruited as saxophonist. Jazz historian Robert Gluck later discussed the performance: 
"The recording functions on two layers: a relatively static, dense thicket of rhythmic pulse provided by McLaughlin's percussive guitar attack, the multiple percussionists, and Henderson's funky bass lines, plus keyboard swirls on which the horn players solo. Segments of tabla and sitar provide a change of mood and pace. Aside from 'Black Satin,' most of the material consists of intense vamps and rhythmic layering."

Compared to Davis' previous recordings, On the Corner found the musician playing the trumpet scarcely, instead often playing keyboards. It also saw his producer, Teo Macero, employ cut-and-splice tape editing procedures (pioneered in the late 1960s on In a Silent Way) to combine various takes in creating a single cohesive work. which also allowed Macero and Davis to overdub and add effects. Some of the musicians expressed misgivings about the unconventional musical direction of the sessions: Liebman opined that "the music appeared to be pretty chaotic and disorganized," while Buckmaster stated that "it was my least favorite Miles album."

Packaging
The album cover featured an illustration by cartoonist Corky McCoy depicting ghetto caricatures, including prostitutes, gays, activists, winos, and drug dealers. The packaging only featured one stylized photograph of Davis, and was originally released with no musician credits, leading to ongoing confusion about which musicians appeared on the album. Davis later admitted to doing this intentionally: "I didn't put those names on On the Corner specially for that reason, so now the critics have to say, 'What's this instrument, and what's this? ... I'm not even gonna put my picture on albums anymore. Pictures are dead, man. You close your eyes and you're there."

Reception 

On the Corner was panned by most critics and contemporaries in jazz; according to Tingen, it became "the most vilified and controversial album in the history of jazz" only a few weeks after its release. Saxophonist Stan Getz proclaimed: "That music is worthless. It means nothing; there is no form, no content, and it barely swings." Jazz Journal critic Jon Brown wrote, "it sounds merely as if the band had selected a chord and decided to worry hell out of it for three-quarters of an hour," concluding that "I'd like to think that nobody could be so easily pleased as to dig this record to any extent." Eugene Chadbourne, writing for jazz magazine CODA, described it as "pure arrogance." In his 1974 biography of Davis, critic Bill Coleman described the album as "an insult to the intellect of the people." Rock journalist Robert Christgau later suggested that jazz critics were not receptive to On the Corner "because the improvisations are rhythmic rather than melodic" and Davis played the organ more than trumpet. Regarding the appeal its music had for rock critics, he praised "Black Satin" but expressed reservations about the absence of a "good" beat elsewhere on the album. Ian MacDonald of the NME declared the album was "monumentally boring".  MacDonald thought "Black Satin" had "a nice theme, but nothing gets done with it" while "Vote for Miles" had "some genuinely funky playing — but then the tablas, tamburas, hand-claps, hi-hats, and whatnot catch on to what he's doing and ruin it." In a positive review for Rolling Stone, Ralph J. Gleason found the music very "lyrical and rhythmic" while praising the dynamic stereo recording and calling Davis "a magician". He concluded by saying "the impact of the whole is greater than the sum of any part."

The album's commercial performance was as limited as that of Davis's albums since Bitches Brew, topping the Billboard jazz chart but only peaking at #156 in the more heterogeneous Billboard 200. Paul Tingen wrote that "predictably, this impenetrable and almost tuneless concoction of avant-garde classical, free jazz, African, Indian and acid funk bombed spectacularly, leading to decades in the wilderness. As far as the jazzers were concerned, it completed Davis's journey from icon to fallen idol."

Legacy and reappraisal 

Despite remaining outside the purview of the mainstream jazz community, On the Corner underwent a positive critical reassessment in subsequent decades; according to Tingen, many critics outside jazz have characterized it as "a visionary musical statement that was way ahead of its time". In 2014, Stereogum hailed it as "one of the greatest records of the 20th Century, and easily one of Miles Davis' most astonishing achievements," noting the album's mix of "funk guitars, Indian percussion, dub production techniques, loops that predict hip hop." According to Alternative Press, the "essential masterpiece" envisioned much of modern popular music, "representing the high water mark of [Davis'] experiments in the fusion of rock, funk, electronica and jazz". Fact characterized the album as "a frenetic and punky record, radical in its use of studio technology," adding that "the debt that the modern dance floor owes the pounding abstractions of On the Corner has yet to be fully understood."
 Writing for The Vinyl Factory, Anton Spice described it as "the great great grandfather of hip-hop, IDM, jungle, post-rock and other styles drawing meaning from repetition."

On the Corner was featured on the six-disc box set The Complete On the Corner Sessions, released in 2007 and featuring previously unreleased recordings from Davis' 1970s electric period. Reviewing the box set in The Wire, critic Mark Fisher wrote that "[t]he passing of time often neutralises and naturalises sounds that were once experimental, but retrospection has not made On the Corners febrile, bilious stew any easier to digest." Stylus Magazines Chris Smith wrote that the record's music anticipated musical principles that abandoned a focus on a single soloist in favor of collective playing: "At times harshly minimal, at others expansive and dense, it upset quite a few people. You could call it punk." On the Corner was cited by SF Weekly as prefiguring subsequent funk, jazz, post-punk, electronica, and hip hop. According to AllMusic's Thom Jurek, "the music on the album itself influenced – either positively or negatively – every single thing that came after it in jazz, rock, soul, funk, hip-hop, electronic and dance music, ambient music, and even popular world music, directly or indirectly." BBC Music reviewer Chris Jones expressed the view that the music and production techniques of On the Corner "prefigured and in some cases gave birth to nu-jazz, jazz funk, experimental jazz, ambient and even world music." Pitchfork described the album as "longing, passion and rage milked from the primal source and heading into the dark beyond."

Fact named On the Corner the 11th best album of the 1970s, while Pitchfork named the album the 30th best album of that decade. The Wire named On the Corner one of its "100 Records That Set the World on Fire (While No One Was Listening)". According to the magazine's David Stubbs, On the Corner was "Miles's most extreme foray into what was often pejoratively dismissed as jazz rock and is still regarded by many critics today as a grotesque, period aberration". John F. Szwed also wrote of the album in The Wire:

Despite the record's influence on numerous artists outside of jazz, "the mainstream jazz community still won't touch On the Corner with a barge pole", according to Tingen, "and whatever remains of jazz-rock continues to be too deeply in thrall of the pyrotechnics aspect of such 1970s bands as Mahavishnu Orchestra to take any notice of On the Corners repetitive funk, which was the antithesis of virtuosity." For its fusion of jazz harmonies with funk rhythms and rock instrumentation, On the Corner was regarded by both Davis biographer Jack Chambers and music essayist Simon Reynolds as exemplary of the trumpeter's jazz-rock music, and Mick Wall viewed it as a "jazz-rock cornerstone". According to NPR Music's Felix Contreras, On the Corner was one of 1972's "jazz-rock hybrids" that "blurred the lines between rock and jazz, if not outright combining them", along with I Sing the Body Electric by Weather Report and Santana's Caravanserai. Jazz scholar Paul Lopes cited the album as an example of jazz-funk, and ethnomusicologist Rob Bowman called it "a milestone" in the genre, while Barry Miles believed it was a jazz-funk album that also "qualifies as prog rock because no one at the time knew what to call it." Pat Thomas from Juxtapoz magazine wrote in retrospect that the record explored psychedelic funk. On the Corner was also viewed by Dave Segal from The Stranger as a "landmark fusion album" and by Vice journalist Jeff Andrews as one of jazz fusion's two greatest albums, the other being Davis' 1970 Bitches Brew record. While noting its inclusiveness and transcendence of a variety of musical genres, Howard Mandel regarded the album as both jazz and avant-garde music, while Stubbs said "this riff beast is a hybrid of funk and rock but is more atavistic, more avant garde than anything conventionally dreamt of by either genre".

Track listing
All compositions written by Miles Davis.

"Black Satin" was released as a single under the name "Molester". Some CD releases split up all sections of LP tracks 1 & 5 into individual tracks.

Personnel
 Miles Davis – electric trumpet with wah-wah, organ
 Michael Henderson – bass guitar with wah-wah
 Don Alias – drums, percussion
 Jack DeJohnette – drums
 Al Foster – drums
 Billy Hart – drums
 James Mtume – percussion
 Carlos Garnett – soprano saxophone, tenor saxophone
 Dave Liebman – soprano saxophone, tenor saxophone
 Bennie Maupin – bass clarinet
 Chick Corea – Fender Rhodes, keyboards
 Herbie Hancock – Fender Rhodes, keyboards
 Harold Ivory Williams – keyboards
 Cedric Lawson – organ
 Dave Creamer – guitar
 Reggie Lucas – guitar
 John McLaughlin – guitar
 Khalil Balakrishna – electric sitar
 Collin Walcott – electric sitar
 Paul Buckmaster – cello
 Badal Roy – tabla

Charts

References

Sources

External links
 On the Corner track sheets at the Miles Beyond web site
 The Most Hated Album in Jazz at The Guardian
 List of top album rankings for On the Corner at AcclaimedMusic.net

1972 albums
Miles Davis albums
Columbia Records albums
Jazz fusion albums by American artists
Jazz-funk albums
Legacy Recordings albums
Albums arranged by Paul Buckmaster
Albums produced by Teo Macero